Family7 is a Dutch faith-based television channel. The programming is in line with Evangelicalism. Family7 is funded by donations from viewers, donors and some companies in exchange for advertising spots between programs on the channel.

References

Television channels and stations established in 2005
Television channels in the Netherlands